The 2016–17 San Antonio Spurs season was the franchise's 50th season, its 44th season in the San Antonio area, and its 41st in the National Basketball Association (NBA). This season was the team's first without longtime team cornerstone Tim Duncan since 1996–97; Duncan retired from the NBA on July 11, 2016 as a five–time champion and the first NBA player ever to win championships in three straight decades. With the elimination of the NHL (National Hockey League)'s Detroit Red Wings from the 2017 Stanley Cup playoffs on March 28, 2017, the Spurs—with 20 consecutive NBA Playoffs appearances—held the longest active playoff streak in any of the major professional sports leagues in the United States and Canada.

Despite Duncan no longer on the team, the Spurs finished the regular season with a 61–21 record, securing the second seed in the Western Conference playoffs for the second straight year. In the first round of the playoffs, the Spurs defeated the Memphis Grizzlies in six games. In the Western Conference Semifinals, they defeated the Houston Rockets in six games. In the Western Conference Finals, the Spurs were swept by the eventual NBA champion Golden State Warriors in four games. This was San Antonio's first time being swept in the playoffs since the 2010 Western Conference Semifinals, when they were defeated by the Steve Nash-led Phoenix Suns. The Spurs were also close to rematching the defending NBA champions Cleveland Cavaliers in the Finals for the first time since 2007.

Since then, this is the only time in the post-Tim Duncan era that the Spurs advanced past the First Round of the Western Conference Playoffs as well as won 60 or more games.

Season synopsis

Preseason
The 2016 NBA draft was held on June 23, 2016, at the Barclays Center in Brooklyn. Spurs chose guard Dejounte Murray with the 29th pick of the first round.

On July 11, Tim Duncan announced his retirement from the NBA.

On July 19, it was confirmed that the Spurs would play a game at the Mexico City Arena in Mexico City, Mexico on January 14, 2017 against the Phoenix Suns.

Regular season
On March 8, with a 114–104 win over the Sacramento Kings the Spurs extended their league record for consecutive 50+ win seasons to 18 straight.

On April 4, with a 95–89(OT) win over the Memphis Grizzlies the Spurs secured their first back to back 60+ win seasons in team history.

Playoffs

The San Antonio Spurs were eliminated 4-0 by the Golden State Warriors in the Western Conference Finals.

Draft

Roster

Standings

Division

Conference

Game log

Pre-season

|- style="background:#fbb;"
| 1
| October 3
| @ Phoenix
| 
| Kawhi Leonard (17)
| Bryn Forbes (7)
| Nicolas Laprovittola (4)
| Talking Stick Resort Arena8,076
| 0–1
|- style="background:#bfb;"
| 2
| October 8
| Atlanta
| 
| Tony Parker (15)
| LaMarcus Aldridge (6)
| Gasol, Green, Lee, Mills (3)
| AT&T Center18,555
| 1–1
|- style="background:#bfb;"
| 3
| October 10
| @ Detroit
| 
| Kawhi Leonard (20)
| LaMarcus Aldridge (9)
| Laprovittola, Parker (4)
| The Palace of Auburn Hills12,103
| 2–1
|- style="background:#bfb;"
| 4
| October 12
| @ Orlando
| 
| Pau Gasol (14)
| Dewayne Dedmon (7)
| Pau Gasol (4)
| Amway Center15,092
| 3–1
|- style="background:#fbb;"
| 5
| October 14
| Miami
| 
| Dedmon, Leonard (11)
| Kyle Anderson (7)
| Tony Parker (4)
| AT&T Center18,418
| 3–2
|- style="background:#bfb;"
| 6
| October 21
| Houston
| 
| Bryn Forbes (19)
| Pau Gasol (9)
| Ryan Arcidiacono (6)
| AT&T Center18,418
| 4–2

Regular season

|- style="background:#bfb;"
| 1
| October 25
| @ Golden State
| 
| Kawhi Leonard (35)
| LaMarcus Aldridge (14)
| Patty Mills (5)
| Oracle Arena  19,596
| 1–0
|- style="background:#bfb"
| 2
| October 27
| @ Sacramento
| 
| Kawhi Leonard (30)
| Kyle Anderson (8)
| Leonard, Ginobili (5)
| Golden 1 Center17,608
| 2–0
|- style="background:#bfb"
| 3
| October 29
| New Orleans
| 
| Kawhi Leonard (20)
| Pau Gasol (8)
| Patty Mills (5)
| AT&T Center18,418
| 3–0
|- style="background:#bfb"
| 4
| October 30
| @ Miami
| 
| Kawhi Leonard (27)
| Gasol, Lee (11)
| Kawhi Leonard (6)
| American Airlines Arena19,678
| 4–0

|- style="background:#fbb"
| 5
| November 1
| Utah
| 
| Kawhi Leonard (30)
| Pau Gasol (8)
| Tony Parker (6)
| AT&T Center18,418
| 4–1
|- style="background:#bfb"
| 6
| November 4
| @ Utah
| 
| Kawhi Leonard (29)
| Kawhi Leonard (11)
| Kawhi Leonard (4)
| Vivint Smart Home Arena19,911
| 5–1
|- style="background:#fbb;"
| 7
| November 5
| L. A. Clippers
| 
| LaMarcus Aldridge (19)
| Leonard, Aldridge (6)
| Mills, Laprovittola (5)
| AT&T Center18,418
| 5–2
|- style="background:#fbb"
| 8
| November 9
| Houston
| 
| Kawhi Leonard (34)
| Leonard, Gasol (7)
| Patty Mills (10)
| AT&T Center18,418
| 5–3
|- style="background:#bfb"
| 9
| November 11
| Detroit
| 
| Kawhi Leonard (21)
| LaMarcus Aldridge (12)
| Kawhi Leonard (6)
| AT&T Center18,418
| 6–3
|- style="background:#bfb"
| 10
| November 12
| @ Houston
| 
| Kawhi Leonard (20)
| LaMarcus Aldridge (10)
| Pau Gasol (6)
| Toyota Center18,055
| 7–3
|- style="background:#bfb"
| 11
| November 14
| Miami
| 
| Kawhi Leonard (24)
| Kawhi Leonard (12)
| Tony Parker (6)
| AT&T Center18,418
| 8–3
|- style="background:#bfb"
| 12
| November 16
| @ Sacramento
| 
| LaMarcus Aldridge (21)
| Pau Gasol (9)
| Tony Parker (7)
| AT&T Center17,608
| 9–3
|- style="background:#bfb"
| 13
| November 18
| @ L.A. Lakers
| 
| Leonard, Aldridge (23)
| Kawhi Leonard (12)
| Leonard, Parker (7)
| Staples Center18,997
| 10–3
|- style="background:#bfb"
| 14
| November 21
| Dallas
| 
| Kawhi Leonard (24)
| Kawhi Leonard (9)
| Leonard, Murray, Green (4)
| AT&T Center18,418
| 11–3
|- style="background:#bfb"
| 15
| November 23
| @ Charlotte
| 
| Kawhi Leonard (30)
| Pau Gasol (8)
| Pau Gasol (5)
| Spectrum Center18,515
| 12–3
|- style="background:#bfb"
| 16
| November 25
| @ Boston
| 
| Kawhi Leonard (25)
| Kawhi Leonard (10)
| Leonard, Parker, Aldridge (4)
| TD Garden18,624
| 13–3
|- style="background:#bfb"
| 17
| November 26
| @ Washington
| 
| LaMarcus Aldridge (24)
| Pau Gasol (10)
| Kawhi Leonard (5)
| Verizon Center 17,066
| 14–3
|- style="background:#fbb"
| 18
| November 29
| Orlando
| 
| Kawhi Leonard (21)
| Dewayne Dedmon (8)
| Gasol, Parker, Aldridge, Ginobili (4)
| AT&T Center18,418
| 14–4
|- style="background:#bfb"
| 19
| November 30
| @ Dallas
| 
| Patty Mills (23)
| Dewayne Dedmon (10)
| Patty Mills (4)
| American Airlines Center19,245
| 15–4

|- style="background:#bfb"
| 20
| December 2
| Washington
| 
| LaMarcus Aldridge (23)
| Pau Gasol (10)
| Patty Mills (8)
| AT&T Center18,418
| 16–4
|- style="background:#bfb"
| 21
| December 5
| @ Milwaukee
| 
| Kawhi Leonard (21)
| Leonard, Aldridge, Gasol (9)
| Parker, Aldridge, Mills (5)
| BMO Harris Bradley Center14,256
| 17–4
|- style="background:#bfb"
| 22
| December 6
| @ Minnesota
| 
| Kawhi Leonard (31)
| Dewayne Dedmon (8)
| Patty Mills (5)
| Target Center12,585
| 18–4
|- style="background:#fbb"
| 23
| December 8
| @ Chicago
| 
| Kawhi Leonard (24)
| Pau Gasol (10)
| Parker, Leonard (5)
| United Center21,489
| 18–5
|- style="background:#bfb"
| 24
| December 10
| Brooklyn
| 
| Kawhi Leonard (30)
| LaMarcus Aldridge (9)
| Tony Parker (7)
| AT&T Center18,418
| 19–5
|- style="background:#bfb"
| 25
| December 14
| Boston
| 
| Kawhi Leonard (30)
| Pau Gasol (13)
| Tony Parker (7)
| AT&T Center18,418
| 20–5
|- style="background:#bfb;"
| 26 
| December 15
| @ Phoenix
| 
| Gasol, Leonard (18)
| Kawhi Leonard (10)
| Kawhi Leonard (4)
| Talking Stick Resort Arena17,165
| 21–5
|- style="background:#bfb;"
| 27
| December 18
| New Orleans
| 
| LaMarcus Aldridge (22)
| Pau Gasol (14)
| Patty Mills (7)
| AT&T Center18,615
| 22–5
|- style="background:#bfb;"
| 28
| December 20
| @ Houston
|  
| Kawhi Leonard (21)
| Aldridge, Gasol (10)
| LaMarcus Aldridge (5)
| Toyota Center18,055
| 23–5
|- style="background:#fbb;"
| 29
| December 22
| @ LA Clippers
|  
| Kawhi Leonard (27)
| Leonard, Gasol (9)
| Kawhi Leonard (5)
| Staples Center19,060
| 23–6
|- style="background:#bfb;"
| 30
| December 23
| @ Portland
|  
| Kawhi Leonard (33)
| LaMarcus Aldridge (14)
| LaMarcus Aldridge (6)
| Moda Center19,393
| 24–6
|- style="background:#bfb;"
| 31
| December 25
| Chicago
|  
| LaMarcus Aldridge (33)
| Kawhi Leonard (10)
| Tony Parker (8)
| AT&T Center18,428
| 25–6
|- style="background:#bfb;"
| 32
| December 28
| Phoenix
|  
| LaMarcus Aldridge (27)
| Pau Gasol (10)
| Kyle Anderson (5)
| AT&T Center18,418
| 26–6
|- style="background:#bfb;"
| 33
| December 30
| Portland
|  
| Jonathon Simmons (19)
| Kyle Anderson (8)
| Tony Parker (5)
| AT&T Center18,418
| 27–6

|- style="background:#fbb;"
| 34
| January 1
| @ Atlanta
|  
| LaMarcus Aldridge (27)
| LaMarcus Aldridge (13)
| Tony Parker (6)
| Philips Arena18,088
| 27–7
|- style="background:#bfb;"
| 35
| January 3
| Toronto
| 
| Kawhi Leonard (25)
| LaMarcus Aldridge (8)
| Tony Parker (8)
| AT&T Center18,418
| 28–7
|- style="background:#bfb;"
| 36
| January 5
| @ Denver
| 
| LaMarcus Aldridge (28)
| Pau Gasol (9)
| Tony Parker (9)
| Pepsi Center14,391
| 29–7
|-style="background:#bfb;"
| 37
| January 7
| Charlotte
| 
| Davis Bertans (21)
| LaMarcus Aldridge (11)
| Jonathon Simmons (5)
| AT&T Center18,418
| 30–7
|-style="background:#fbb;"
| 38
| January 10
| Milwaukee
| 
| Kawhi Leonard (30)
| Pau Gasol (11)
| Tony Parker (7)
| AT&T Center18,418
| 30–8
|- style="background:#bfb;"
| 39
| January 12
| L. A. Lakers
| 
| Kawhi Leonard (31)
| Dewayne Dedmon (12)
| Gasol, Parker (6)
| AT&T Center18,418
| 31–8
|- style="background:#fbb;"
| 40
| January 14
| @ Phoenix
| 
| Kawhi Leonard (38)
| Pau Gasol (10)
| Leonard, Ginobili (3)
| Mexico City Arena (Mexico City)20,532
| 31–9
|- style="background:#bfb;"
| 41
| January 17
| Minnesota
| 
| Kawhi Leonard (34)
| Leonard, Dedmon (7)
| Leonard, Parker (5)
| AT&T Center18,418
| 32–9
|- style="background:#bfb;"
| 42
| January 19
| Denver
| 
| Kawhi Leonard (34)
| David Lee (16)
| LaMarcus Aldridge (6)
| AT&T Center18,418
| 33–9
|-style="background:#bfb;"
| 43
| January 21
| @ Cleveland
| 
| Kawhi Leonard (41)
| LaMarcus Aldridge (12)
| Murray, Aldridge (6)
| Quicken Loans Arena20,562
| 34–9
|- style="background:#bfb;"
| 44
| January 23
| @ Brooklyn
| 
| Patty Mills (20)
| LaMarcus Aldridge (9)
| LaMarcus Aldridge (5)
| Barclays Center16,643
| 35–9
|- style="background:#bfb;"
| 45
| January 24
| @ Toronto
| 
| LaMarcus Aldridge (21)
| Aldridge, Anderson, Green (7)
| Kyle Anderson (4)
| Air Canada Centre19,800
| 36–9
|- style= "background:#fbb;"
| 46
| January 27
| @ New Orleans
| 
| Kawhi Leonard (23)
| LaMarcus Aldridge (14)
| LaMarcus Aldridge (6)
| Smoothie King Center 17,757
| 36–10
|- style="background:#fbb;"
| 47
| January 29
| Dallas
| 
| Kawhi Leonard (24)
| Patty Mills (8)
| Danny Green (5)
| AT&T Center18,418
| 36–11
|- style="background:#bfb;"
| 48
| January 31
| Oklahoma City
| 
| Kawhi Leonard (36)
| Leonard, Dedmon (8)
| Leonard, Parker, Ginobili (5)
| AT&T Center18,418
| 37–11

|- style="background:#bfb;"
| 49
| February 2
| Philadelphia
| 
| Kawhi Leonard (19)
| Dewayne Dedmon (10)
| Tony Parker (6)
| AT&T Center18,418
| 38–11
|- style="background:#bfb;"
| 50
| February 4
| Denver
| 
| Kawhi Leonard (19)
| Kawhi Leonard (6)
| Leonard, Anderson (5)
| AT&T Center18,418
| 39–11
|- style="background:#fbb;"
| 51
| February 6
| @ Memphis
| 
| David Lee (14)
| Dewayne Dedmon (12)
| Ginobili, Mills (3)
| FedExForum16,708
| 39–12
|- style="background:#bfb;"
| 52
| February 8
| @ Philadelphia
| 
| Kawhi Leonard (32)
| Dewayne Dedmon (11)
| Leonard, Parker (5)
| Wells Fargo Center19,233
| 40–12
|- style="background:#bfb;"
| 53
| February 10
| @ Detroit
| 
| Kawhi Leonard (32)
| Dewayne Dedmon (17)
| Tony Parker (12)
| The Palace of Auburn Hills17,222
| 41–12
|- style=background:#fbb;"
| 54
| February 12
| @ New York
| 
| Kawhi Leonard (36)
| LaMarcus Aldridge (10)
| Leonard, Parker, Ginobili (4)
| Madison Square Garden19,812 
| 41–13
|- style= "background:#bfb;"
| 55
| February 13
| @ Indiana
|  
| Kawhi Leonard (32)
| Dewayne Dedmon (12)
| Tony Parker (4)
| Bankers Life Fieldhouse15,203
| 42–13
|- style= "background:#bfb;"
| 56
| February 15
| @ Orlando
| 
| LaMarcus Aldridge (23)
| Dewayne Dedmon (11)
| Tony Parker (8)
| Amway Center17,101
| 43–13
|- style=background:#bfb;"
|57
| February 24
| @ L. A. Clippers
| 
| Kawhi Leonard (21)
| Dewayne Dedmon (12)
| Kawhi Leonard (6)
| Staples Center19,060
| 44–13
|- style=background:#bfb;"
| 58
| February 26
| @ L. A. Lakers
| 
| Kawhi Leonard (25)
| Aldridge, Dedmon (9)
| Tony Parker (9)
| Staples Center18,997
| 45–13

|- style=background:#bfb;"
| 59
| March 1
| Indiana
| 
| Kawhi Leonard (31)
| Kawhi Leonard (10)
| Dejounte Murray (6)
| AT&T Center18,418
| 46–13
|- style=background:#bfb;"
| 60
| March 3
| @ New Orleans
| 
| Kawhi Leonard (31)
| LaMarcus Aldridge (15)
| Kawhi Leonard (6)
| Smoothie King Center17,669
| 47–13
|- style=background:#bfb;"
| 61
| March 4
| Minnesota
| 
| Kawhi Leonard (34)
| Aldridge, Leonard (10)
| Kawhi Leonard (5)
| AT&T Center18,418
| 48–13
|- style="background:#bfb;"
| 62
| March 6
| Houston
| 
| Kawhi Leonard (39)
| David Lee (8)
| Leonard, Green (5)
| AT&T Center18,418
| 49–13
|- style="background:#bfb;"
| 63
| March 8
| Sacramento
| 
| Manu Ginóbili (19)
| David Lee (10)
| Patty Mills (10)
| AT&T Center18,418
| 50–13
|- style="background:#fbb;"
| 64
| March 9
| @ Oklahoma City
| 
| Kawhi Leonard (19)
| Dewayne Dedmon (8)
| Murray, Green (6)
| Chesapeake Energy Arena18,203
| 50–14
|- style="background:#bfb;"
| 65
| March 11
| Golden State
|  
| Patty Mills (21)
| Kyle Anderson (8)
| Ginobili, Anderson (6)
| AT&T Center18,418
| 51–14
|- style="background:#bfb;"
| 66
| March 13
| Atlanta
|  
| Kawhi Leonard (31)
| Dewayne Dedmon (8)
| Patty Mills (9)
| AT&T Center18,418
| 52–14
|- style="background:#fbb;"
| 67
| March 15
| Portland
|  
| Kawhi Leonard (34)
| Kawhi Leonard (9)
| Ginobili, Leonard, Mills (6)
| AT&T Center18,418
| 52–15
|- style="background:#fbb;"
| 68
| March 18
| @ Memphis
| 
| Kawhi Leonard (22)
| Aldridge, Gasol (9)
| LaMarcus Aldridge (4)
| FedExForum18,119
| 52–16
|- style="background:#bfb;"
| 69
| March 19
| Sacramento
|  
| Pau Gasol (22)
| Pau Gasol (9)
| Mills, Parker (7)
| AT&T Center18,418
| 53–16
|- style="background:#bfb;"
| 70
| March 21
| @ Minnesota
| 
| LaMarcus Aldridge (26)
| Pau Gasol (6)
| Tony Parker (5)
| Target Center13,742
| 54–16
|- style="background:#bfb;"
| 71
| March 23
| Memphis
| 
| LaMarcus Aldridge (23)
| LaMarcus Aldridge (8)
| Tony Parker (7)
| AT&T Center18,418
| 55–16
|- style="background:#bfb;"
| 72
| March 25
| New York
| 
| Kawhi Leonard (29)
| Dewayne Dedmon (13)
| Patty Mills (7)
| AT&T Center18,418
| 56–16
|- style="background:#bfb;"
| 73
| March 27
| Cleveland
| 
| Kawhi Leonard (25)
| Dewayne Dedmon (13)
| Patty Mills (6)
| AT&T Center18,418
| 57–16
|- style="background:#fbb;"
| 74
| March 29
| Golden State
| 
| Kawhi Leonard (19)
| Pau Gasol (8)
| Leonard, Gasol (5)
| AT&T Center18,418
| 57–17
|- style="background:#bfb;"
| 75
| March 31
| @ Oklahoma City
| 
| Kawhi Leonard (28)
| LaMarcus Aldridge (10)
| Manu Ginóbili (8)
| Chesapeake Energy Arena18,203
| 58–17

|- style="background:#bfb;"
| 76
| April 2
| Utah
| 
| Kawhi Leonard (25)
| Pau Gasol (12)
| Kawhi Leonard (7)
| AT&T Center18,418
| 59–17
|- style="background:#bfb;"
| 77
| April 4
| Memphis
| 
| Kawhi Leonard (32)
| Kawhi Leonard (12)
| Tony Parker (7)
| AT&T Center18,418
| 60–17
|- style="background:#fbb;"
| 78
| April 5
| L. A. Lakers
| 
| Bertans, Parker (14)
| Pau Gasol (8)
| David Lee (6)
| AT&T Center18,418
| 60–18
|- style="background:#bfb;"
| 79
| April 7
| @ Dallas
| 
| Bryn Forbes (23)
| Dedmon, Lee (13)
| Bryn Forbes (6)
| American Airlines Center20,133
| 61–18
|- style= "background:#fbb;"
| 80
| April 8
| L. A. Clippers
| 
| Kawhi Leonard (28)
| Dewayne Dedmon (10)
| Kawhi Leonard (5)
| AT&T Center18,420
| 61–19
|- style="background:#fbb;"
| 81
| April 10
| @ Portland
| 
| Kawhi Leonard (18)
| Pau Gasol (13)
| Tony Parker (4)
| Moda Center19,393
| 61–20
|- style="background:#fbb;"
| 82
| April 12
| @ Utah
| 
| LaMarcus Aldridge (18)
| Dewayne Dedmon (8)
| Patty Mills (5)
| Vivint Smart Home Arena19,911
| 61–21

Playoffs

|- style="background:#bfb;"
| 1
| April 15
| Memphis
| 
| Kawhi Leonard (32)
| Dewayne Dedmon (8)
| Kawhi Leonard (5)
| AT&T Center18,418
| 1–0
|- style="background:#bfb;"
| 2
| April 17
| Memphis
| 
| Kawhi Leonard (37) 
| Kawhi Leonard (11)
| Ginobili, Mills (3)
| AT&T Center18,418
| 2–0
|- style="background:#fbb;"
| 3
| April 20
| @ Memphis
| 
| Kawhi Leonard (18)
| LaMarcus Aldridge (11)
| Anderson, Leonard, Simmons (3)
| FedExForum18,119
| 2–1
|- style="background:#fbb;"
| 4
| April 22
| @ Memphis
| 
| Kawhi Leonard (43)
| Pau Gasol (11)
| Tony Parker (5)
| FedExForum18,119
| 2–2
|- style="background:#bfb;"
| 5
| April 25
| Memphis
| 
| Kawhi Leonard (28)
| LaMarcus Aldridge (9)
| Leonard, Parker (6)
| AT&T Center18,418
| 3–2
|- style="background:#bfb;"
| 6
| April 27
| @ Memphis
| 
| Kawhi Leonard (28)
| LaMarcus Aldridge (12)
| Leonard, Parker (4)
| FedExForum18,119
| 4–2

|- style="background:#fbb;"
| 1
| May 1
| Houston
| 
| Kawhi Leonard (21)
| Kawhi Leonard (11)
| Kawhi Leonard (6)
| AT&T Center18,418
| 0–1
|-style ="background:#bfb;"
| 2
| May 3
| Houston
| 
| Kawhi Leonard (34)
| Pau Gasol (13)
| Kawhi Leonard (8)
| AT&T Center18,418
| 1–1
|- style="background:#bfb;"
| 3
| May 5
| @ Houston
| 
| Aldridge, Leonard (26)
| Kawhi Leonard (10)
| Kawhi Leonard (7)
| Toyota Center18,187
| 2–1
|-style ="background:#fbb;"
| 4
| May 7 
| @ Houston
| 
| Jonathon Simmons (17)
| Pau Gasol (7)
| Patty Mills (5)
| Toyota Center18,055
| 2–2
|- style="background:#bfb;"
| 5
| May 9
| Houston
| 
| Kawhi Leonard (22)
| Kawhi Leonard (15)
| Manu Ginóbili (5)
| AT&T Center18,418
| 3–2
|- style="background:#bfb;"
| 6
| May 11
| @ Houston
| 
| LaMarcus Aldridge (34)
| LaMarcus Aldridge (12)
| Patty Mills (7)
| Toyota Center18,055
| 4–2
|- style="background:#;"

|- style="background:#fbb;"
| 1
| May 14
| @ Golden State
| 
| LaMarcus Aldridge (28)
| Aldridge, Leonard (8)
| Aldridge, Leonard, Mills (3)
| Oracle Arena19,596
| 0–1
|- style="background:#fbb;"
| 2
| May 16
| @ Golden State
| 
| Jonathon Simmons (22)
| Dewayne Dedmon (9)
| Dejounte Murray (6)
| Oracle Arena19,596
| 0–2
|- style="background:#fbb;"
| 3
| May 20
| Golden State
| 
| Manu Ginóbili (21)
| Pau Gasol (10)
| Patty Mills (6)
| AT&T Center18,792
| 0–3
|- style="background:#fbb;"
| 4
| May 22
| Golden State
| 
| Kyle Anderson (20)
| Pau Gasol (9)
| Ginóbili, Murray (7)
| AT&T Center18,466
| 0–4

Player statistics

Regular season

Playoffs

Transactions

Trades

Free agency

Re-signed

Additions

Subtractions

References

San Antonio Spurs seasons
San Antonio Spurs
San Antonio Spurs
San Antonio Spurs